The Netcong School District is a community public school district that serves students in pre-kindergarten through eighth grade from Netcong, in Morris County, New Jersey, United States.

As of the 2018–19 school year, the district, comprising one school, had an enrollment of 289 students and 26.0 classroom teachers (on an FTE basis), for a student–teacher ratio of 11.1:1.

The district is classified by the New Jersey Department of Education as being in District Factor Group "DE", the fifth-highest of eight groupings. District Factor Groups organize districts statewide to allow comparison by common socioeconomic characteristics of the local districts. From lowest socioeconomic status to highest, the categories are A, B, CD, DE, FG, GH, I and J.

For ninth through twelfth grades, public school students attend Lenape Valley Regional High School, which serves Netcong and the Sussex County communities of Stanhope and Byram Township. As of the 2018–19 school year, the high school had an enrollment of 691 students and 58.0 classroom teachers (on an FTE basis), for a student–teacher ratio of 11.9:1.

History
The district formerly operated Netcong High School. The school, which opened in the 1900s, closed in 1974; the building became Netcong Elementary School.

Judge Joseph Stamler of New Jersey Superior Court issued a decision in February 1970 in the case State Board of Education v. Board of Education of Netcong, New Jersey regarding a matter in which the district's school board had a policy providing for voluntary daily school readings at the start of the school day at the high school of prayers that had been published in the Congressional Record, as delivered by Chaplain of the United States House of Representatives. Attendance at these readings was voluntary, and the board said that they were intended as inspirational remarks, rather than prayer in the schools. In his decision, Judge Stamler prohibited what he described as a "subterfuge [that] is degrading to all religions", arguing that by taking what were "beautiful prayers" and referring to them merely as "remarks", the school district was working to "peddle religion in a very cheap manner under an assumed name."  The New Jersey Supreme Court unanimously affirmed Stamler's decision and the United States Supreme Court refused to hear an appeal from the district's school board.

School
Netcong Elementary School had an enrollment of 285 students in grades PreK-8 as of the 2018–19 school year. Netcong's school offers small class sizes that allow teachers to offer personalized attention not possible in larger schools.
Dr. Kurt Ceresnak, Principal

Administration
Core members of the district's administration are:
Kathleen Walsh, Superintendent
Paul Stabile, Business Administrator / Board Secretary

Board of education
The district's board of education, with nine members, sets policy and oversees the fiscal and educational operation of the district through its administration. As a Type II school district, the board's trustees are elected directly by voters to serve three-year terms of office on a staggered basis, with three seats up for election each year held (since 2012) as part of the November general election.

References

External links
Netcong School District
 
School Data for the Netcong School District, National Center for Education Statistics
Lenape Valley Regional High School

Netcong, New Jersey
New Jersey District Factor Group DE
School districts in Morris County, New Jersey
Public K–8 schools in New Jersey